is a professional tennis player and a former Japanese No. 1.

Tennis career
Suzuki reached a career-high singles ranking of World No. 102 in 1998 and has earned nearly three quarters of a million dollars in prize winnings on the ATP Tour.  He is well known for his outstanding performances against Roger Federer at the Australian Open in 2005 and the 2006 Tokyo Open.

In 2006, Suzuki injured his shoulder at the Australian Open qualifying tournament in a match against Paul Capdeville and sat out most of the season as a result.  He briefly returned to competitive tennis in May in a challenger tournament in South Korea and lost in the quarter finals. In October 2006, Suzuki played in his first International Series event of the year, the Japan Open Tennis Championships held in Tokyo, having received a wildcard into the main draw.  Suzuki, ranked World No. 1078 at the time, won surprise victories over 8th seed Paradorn Srichaphan and World No. 126 Alexander Waske en route to his quarter finals berth against Federer.  Suzuki once again lost to Federer in three sets, 6–4, 5–7, 6–7(3).

ATP career finals

Doubles: 1 (1 title)

Performance timelines

Singles

ATP Challenger and ITF Futures finals

Singles: 22 (17–5)

Doubles: 24 (18–6)

References

External links
 
 
 
  Takao Suzuki Official Site 

1976 births
Living people
Japanese male tennis players
Sportspeople from Sapporo
Sportspeople from Tokyo
Tennis players at the 1996 Summer Olympics
Asian Games medalists in tennis
Hopman Cup competitors
Tennis players at the 2002 Asian Games
Tennis players at the 2006 Asian Games
Tennis players at the 2010 Asian Games
Asian Games gold medalists for Japan
Asian Games silver medalists for Japan
Asian Games bronze medalists for Japan
Medalists at the 2002 Asian Games
Medalists at the 2006 Asian Games
Medalists at the 2010 Asian Games
Olympic tennis players of Japan
20th-century Japanese people
21st-century Japanese people